Calthropella is a genus of sea sponges in the order Tetractinellida. It is the only genus in the monotypic family Calthropellidae.

Species
The following species are recognised in the genus Calthropella:
 Calthropella durissima Topsent, 1892
 Calthropella geodioides (Carter, 1876)
 Calthropella enigmatica (Lévi & Lévi, 1983)
 Calthropella inopinata Pulitzer-Finali, 1983
 Calthropella lithistina (Schmidt, 1880)
 Calthropella novaezealandiae (Bergquist, 1961)
 Calthropella pathologica (Schmidt, 1868)
 Calthropella pyrifera van Soest, Beglinger & de Voogd, 2010
 Calthropella recondita Pulitzer-Finali, 1972
 Calthropella simplex Sollas, 1888
 Calthropella stelligera (Schmidt, 1868)
 Calthropella xavierae van Soest, Beglinger & de Voogd, 2010

References 

 

Tetractinellida